Total refraction occurs when an incident wave on an interface between two media with opposite refractive index signs is completely transmitted. There is then no reflected wave. This can occur only when one of the two materials has a negative refractive index. Composite metamaterials with this unusual property were fabricated for the first time in 2002. This phenomenon is conditioned by the wave impedance matching between the two media.

Physical optics
Geometrical optics

ru:Преломление полное